Cilnia chopardi is a species of praying mantis in the family Miomantidae.

The species in native to South Africa.

See also
List of mantis genera and species

References

Mantidae
Mantodea of Africa
Insects of South Africa
Insects described in 1927